Bottle Beach State Park is a public recreation area on the southern shore of Grays Harbor in Grays Harbor County, Washington. It was created at the urging of birding experts Bob Morse and Ruby Egbert, who personally donated funds for land purchases at the site in 1993 and for whom the park's Ruby Egbert Natural Area is named. The park opened in 1995. Activities include hiking, birdwatching, and wildlife viewing.

References

External links
Bottle Beach State Park Washington State Parks and Recreation Commission

State parks of Washington (state)
Parks in Grays Harbor County, Washington
Protected areas established in 1993